This is a timeline of online video, meaning streaming media delivered over the Internet.

Overview

Full timeline

References

Technology timelines